Clem Lewis (22 June 1890 – 27 October 1944) was a Welsh international fly-half who played club rugby for Cardiff. Lewis was capped for Wales eleven times either side of World War I, and captained his country on two occasions. Born in Bridgend, Lewis moved to first class team, Cardiff, in 1909 from local club Bridgend. Lewis won two rugby 'blues' for Cambridge and played for invitational team the Barbarians.

International career
Lewis was first capped for Wales against England in the 1912 Five Nations Championship. The previous season, Wales had won the tournament, but Lewis was one of six new caps in the team who fell at the first hurdle, losing 8–0. Although Lewis did not play in the remainder of the tournament he was back the next year scoring a try and a conversion in his second game against Scotland. After serving in World War I, Lewis rejoined Cardiff and was recalled to the Welsh squad in 1921, and in 1923 captained the national team twice.

International matches played
Wales
  1912, 1914, 1923
  1913, 1914
 Ireland 1914, 1914, 1921
  1913, 1914, 1923

Bibliography

References

Welsh rugby union players
Wales international rugby union players
Rugby union fly-halves
1890 births
1944 deaths
Wales rugby union captains
British Army personnel of World War I
Cambridge University R.U.F.C. players
Barbarian F.C. players
Rugby union players from Bridgend